Takigaks — Once Were Hunters is the first long documentary film by the Finnish-Polish director Kira Jääskeläinen. It was filmed during five years in Chukotka, and it was released in 2012.

Background
While studying at the University of Copenhagen in the early years of the new millennium, Jääskeläinen spotted an announcement on the bulletin board of the university. What was wanted were people who could speak the Russian language, to participate in an expedition to Chukotka. Since this place was a remote border region with restricted access, she could not resist the temptation. After the expedition was over, she remained there for some time, just hanging around. Later she wrote her MA thesis on the material she had collected during the expedition. The visual material that had accumulated she put to good use, when she later sought financing for this document. The Bering Strait area made a great impression on Jääskeläinen, “one had a feeling that one’s soul really can be at peace here”.

Filming trips
Jääskeläinen went on the first filming trip alone, but during the subsequent three trips she had a cameraman as well as a sound man.

During the first trip Jääskeläinen found the persons whom she would film, made a deal with them and made sure that they were interested in participating in this project.

The filming trips were rather long, a one-way trip might take two or even three weeks, because connections might not function or weather could delay the travel. Thus it was natural that much time was spent on location.

Jääskeläinen was the only one in the group who could speak Russian, so she took care of all the practical matters. For a woman to have that role was something new for the most of the locals.

The making of the film took five years. Time and again the project was abandoned, and then resurrected again, “I had a feeling that this would never be completed”.

The contents of the documentary
Takigaks — Once Were Hunters is a film about two brothers, Kolya and Sasha, who are Siberian Yupiks and live in Novoye Chaplino, at the eastern extremity of the Chukchi Peninsula.

During the first two trips, Jääskeläinen had made observation on the aboriginal people of the region: “I was touched by the fact that the local whalers live in an incredibly beautiful area, and yet they don’t seem to be quite well psychologically. How would the young people build their identity, if they don’t want to become hunters.”

Of the two brothers, Kolya follows in the footsteps of his ancestors as a whaler. Sasha, however, does not want to be a hunter, instead he works for a Canadian company, until the company goes bankrupt. Life in the region is meagre, and one does not have many choices here. The young women have mostly moved into big cities. The lot of the men is to hunt for sea mammals and to fish. When the schools have been completed and the foreign company no longer provides employment, there is nothing left to do other than to watch the television on drink, if one is not engaged in hunting and fishing.

The helicopters of the Russian border guard follow the hunters, since the location is close to Alaska and the United States. One villager had sneaked out and gone to St. Lawrence Island, and this is no longer allowed to happen. Now the people of Novoye Chaplino can only dream about seeing their relatives on that island.

The document has a slow pace. Neither Kolya nor Sasha are very talkative, and the soundtrack has been recorded separately.

Reception
According to Pia Ingström of Hufvudstadsbladet “this is a fine document that gives much food for thought”:

Critic Taneli Topelius of Iltasanomat writes:

The film was shown in several film festivals in Finland and elsewhere in Europe, and was also shown on Finnish TV on YLE TV1 in March 2014.

Prizes
1. prize, documentary films shorter than one hour
Barents Ecology Film Festival, Petrozavosk, Republic of Karelia, Russia, April 2013.
Special mention by the jury
International Film Festival Pecheurs du Monde, Lorient, Brittany, March 2013.

External links
Takigaks – Once Were Hunters in Facebook

References

Finnish documentary films